The coat of arms of the municipality and city of Weert in Limburg in the Netherlands was assigned to the municipality on 16 November 1977 by royal decree by the High Council of Nobility. It replaced the first coat of arms from 1918.

History
The heerlijkheid Weert already existed in the eleventh century. From the 11th century until 1530 the heerlijkheid was in the possession of the dukes of Horn. The chevron initially appeared on a counter seal, likely at the end of fourteenth century. From 1736 the chevron appeared in the city seal. The origins remain unknown.

In 1977 a chief was added to the coat of arms and within that chief were the three hornes from the coat of arms of the House of Hornes.

Blazon

First coat of arms (1918)

The description of the coat of arms is:

Which translates to:

 The heraldic colours in the coat of arms are argent (white), azure (blue) and or (yellow).

Second coat of arms (1977)
The description of the coat of arms is:

Which translates to:

 The use of a chief of or on a shield of argent appears as conflicting with the rules of colour usage in heraldry. The coat of arms is not an "arms a enquerre", because the chief is a brisure and the rules of tincture do not apply to brisures.

References

 Translated from the Dutch version.

Weert
Weert
Weert